Luiz Martin Carlos Júnior, commonly known as Luiz Júnior or Ceará, (born 13 January 1989) is a Brazilian-born naturalised Qatari footballer who plays as a defender for Al-Duhail in the Qatar Stars League.

He was born in Jaguaruana in the Brazilian state of Ceará.

He won the 2010–11 and 2011–12 edition of the Qatar Stars League with his club Lekhwiya.

International career
Luiz was called up the Qatar B team on 13 November 2013 by former coach Djamel Belmadi. He made official debut for the team on 25 December in the 2014 WAFF Championship in a 1–0 win against Palestine.

References

External links
Player profile - QSL.com.qa

1989 births
Living people
Qatari footballers
Brazilian footballers
Sportspeople from Ceará
Association football defenders
Lekhwiya SC players
Al-Duhail SC players
Brazilian expatriate footballers
Qatar international footballers
Qatar Stars League players
Expatriate footballers in Qatar
Brazilian expatriate sportspeople in Qatar
Qatari people of Brazilian descent
Naturalised citizens of Qatar